The West Atlanta Watershed Alliance Outdoor Activity Center (OAC) is a public environmental education , nature preserve, and outdoor activity facility in Atlanta, Georgia.

When the center opened in 1975 as the Bush Mountain Outdoor Activity Center, it was Atlanta's "first and only environmental education and outdoor recreation facility." Atlanta Public Schools leased  to the OAC for $1 a year, and the Natural Science for Youth Foundation helped fund, organize and staff the original center. The Atlanta Bureau of Parks and Recreation later purchased the property from the school system and assumed maintenance of the parkland.

In 2007, the National Wildlife Federation referred to the OAC as "an ecological jewel."

The center is located beside the former practice lot for the Atlanta Black Crackers.

See also
John Ripley Forbes

References

Nature centers in Georgia (U.S. state)
Geography of Atlanta
Education in Atlanta
Tourist attractions in Atlanta